The following lists events in the year 2018 in Israel.

Incumbents
 President – Reuven Rivlin
 Prime Minister – Benjamin Netanyahu
 President of the Supreme Court – Esther Hayut
 Chief of General Staff – Gadi Eizenkot
 Government of Israel – 34th government of Israel

Events

January
 2 January – Israel announces plans to deport African migrants who reside in the country illegally, with 90 days given to either leave the country or face imprisonment.

February
 5 February – 2018 Ariel stabbing
 9–25 February – Israel at the 2018 Winter Olympics
 10 February – 2018 Israel–Syria incident

March
 30 March – Start of the 2018 Gaza border protests

April
 26 April – Ten youths from a pre-military academy die after being carried off by a surge in the Tzafit stream west of the Dead Sea amid floodings caused by intense storms that strike southern Israel.
 30 April – Israeli Prime Minister Benjamin Netanyahu accuses Iran of not holding up its end of the nuclear deal with the P5+1 countries after presenting a cache over 100,000 documents detailing the extent of Iran's nuclear program. Iran denounced Netanyahu's presentation as "propaganda". Shortly after President Trump withdrew the United States from the Joint Comprehensive Plan of Action.

May

 4–27 May – 2018 Giro d'Italia
 10 May – Iran's Quds Force on the Syrian-held side of the Golan Heights fired around 20 projectiles towards Israeli army positions without causing damages or injuries. In response, Israel launched an extensive strike against Iranian targets in Syria.
 12 May – Netta Barzilai wins first place for Israel at the Eurovision Song Contest with her song "Toy".
 14 May – The new embassy of the United States opens in Jerusalem.
 23 May – The Knesset passed a law allowing the Security Cabinet to declare war.

June
 June 21 – Sara Netanyahu, wife of Prime Minister Benjamin Netanyahu, was charged for an alleged fraud.
 June 25 – Prince William began a trip to Israel and the Palestinian territories, becoming the first British royal to visit the country in an official capacity.

July
 July 12 – Start of the 2018 World Lacrosse Championship in Netanya
 July 19 – Israel incorporated in its basic laws a declaration of the country as the "nation-state of the Jewish people."

September
 September 17 – Syria missile strikes
 September 25 – Tel Aviv–Jerusalem railway is officially inaugurated.

October
 October 7 – 2018 Barkan Industrial Park shooting
 October 30 – Israeli municipal elections

November
 November 11 – November Gaza–Israel clashes

December
 December 4 – The Israeli military launched Operation Northern Shield to destroy cross-border tunnels built by Hezbollah along Israel's border with Lebanon.
 December 21 – Israel announced its departure from UNESCO, citing bias.

Deaths

 4 January – Aharon Appelfeld, novelist (b. 1932)
 6 January – Batya Ouziel, handicrafter (b. 1934)
 13 January – Eliyahu Winograd, Israeli jurist and acting judge on the Supreme Court of Israel, chairman of the Winograd Commission (b. 1926)
 20 January – Doron Rubin, military officer (b. 1944)
 31 January – Dan Alon, fencer (b. 1945)
 18 February – Ya'akov Ben-Yezri, Israeli politician, Minister of Health (b. 1927)
 24 February – Shmuel Auerbach, Israeli Haredi rabbi and posek (b. 1931)
 5 March – Uri Lubrani, Israeli diplomat (b. 1926)
 23 March – Ephraim Stern, archaeologist (b. 1934)
 24 March – Rim Banna, singer, composer and activist (b. 1966)
 24 March – Frank Meisler, architect and sculptor (b. 1925).
 1 April – Avichai Rontzki, Israeli military Rabbi and rosh yeshiva (b. 1951)
 4 May – Abi Ofarim, musician (b. 1937)
 29 May – Eliezer Rafaeli, director of the University of Haifa (b. 1926)
 20 August – Uri Avnery, peace activist (b. 1923)
 30 October – David Azulai, politician (b. 1954)
 7 December – Shmuel Flatto-Sharon, businessman and politician (b. 1930)
 17 December – Rona Ramon, activist and NGO founder (b. 1964)
 28 December – Amos Oz, writer, novelist and journalist (b. 1939)
 29 December – Zvi Levi, activist and NGO founder (b. 1948)
 29 December – Yehoshua Glazer, footballer (b. 1927)

See also

Israel at the 2018 Winter Olympics
List of violent incidents in the Israeli–Palestinian conflict, 2018
2018 Gaza-Israel conflict

References

 
2010s in Israel
Years of the 21st century in Israel
Israel
Israel